Bottleneck Peak is a natural monolith located on the eastern side of Sids Mountain in the Utah San Rafael Swell wilderness area. Precipitation runoff from this feature drains north into the San Rafael River.

Gallery

References

External links
 Weather forecast: Bottleneck Peak
 Bottleneck Peak rock climbing: Mountainproject.com

Monoliths of the United States
Rock formations of Utah
Landforms of Emery County, Utah